Equisetum palustre, the marsh horsetail, is a plant species belonging to the division of horsetails (Equisetopsida). It is widespread in cooler regions of North America and Eurasia.

Description 
Equisetum palustre is a perennial cryptophyte, growing between 10 and 50 centimeters (4" to 20"), in rare cases up to one meter (3'). Its fertile shoots, which carry ears, are evergreen and shaped like the sterile shoots. The rough, furrowed stem is one to three mm in diameter with usually eight to ten ribs, in rare cases, four to 12. It contains whorled branches. The tight-fitting sheaths end in four to 12 teeth. The lower sheaths are dark brown and much shorter than the sheaths of the main shoot. The central and vallecular canals are about the same size, but the carinal channels are much smaller. The central channels measure about one sixth of the diameter of the stem.

The spores are spread by the wind (anemochory) and have four long ribbon-like structures attached to them. They sit on strobili which are rounded on the top. Marsh Horsetails often form subterranean runners and tubers, with which they also can proliferate vegetatively.

Ecology 
Equisetum palustre is green from spring to autumn and grows spores from June to September.  It grows primarily in nutrient-rich wet meadows. It is found in Europe and the circumpolar region up to mountainous heights. Its distribution is declining. A specific plant association in which E. palustre is found is the Juncus subnodulosus-Cirsium palustre fen-meadow.

Toxicity 
Equisetum palustre is poisonous to mammals, most often reported as potentially fatal to horses, as it contains alkaloids palustrine and palustridiene, which destroy vitamin B1. According to Wink, Equisetum Palustre also contains thiaminase enzymes. It's also known to contain lesser amounts of nicotine. Many thiaminases, however, are denatured by heat, and some sources refer Equisetum palustre safe to eat in moderate amounts when properly cooked.

Taxonomy
Linnaeus was the first to describe marsh horsetail with the binomial Equisetum palustre in his Species Plantarum of 1753.

References

 Flora of North America: Equisetum palustre
 C. Michael Hogan. 2009. Marsh Thistle: Cirsium palustre, GlobalTwitcher.com, ed. N. Strömberg
 . 2009

External links 
 Walkowiak R. J., Equisetum palustre L., IEA Collection of Equisetum, 2019

palustre
Plants described in 1753
Taxa named by Carl Linnaeus
Flora of North America
Flora of Europe
Flora of Asia